Manu Timoti also known as Rawi Timoti is a New Zealand international lawn bowler.

Bowls career
Timoti won the gold medal in the fours with Jan Khan, Marina Khan and Mary Campbell and the bronze medal in the triples at the 2007 Asia Pacific Bowls Championships in Adelaide.

She was selected to represent New Zealand at the 2010 Commonwealth Games, where she competed in the pairs event.

References

New Zealand female bowls players
Living people
Bowls players at the 2010 Commonwealth Games
Commonwealth Games competitors for New Zealand
Year of birth missing (living people)